French onion soup (French: soupe à l’oignon ) is a soup usually based on meat stock and onions, and often served gratinéed with croutons or a larger piece of bread covered with cheese floating on top. Ancient in origin, the dish underwent a resurgence of popularity in the 1960s in the United States due to a greater interest in French cuisine. French onion soup may be served as a meal in itself or as a first course.

History
Onion soups have been popular at least as far back as Roman times. Throughout history, they were seen as food for poor people, as onions were plentiful and easy to grow. The modern  version of this soup originates in Paris, France in the 18th century, made from beef broth, and caramelized onions.

It was introduced to the United States by the New York restaurant of Henri Mouquin in 1861, where his wife Marie Julie Grandjean Mouquin was the chef. It is often finished by being placed under a salamander in a ramekin with croutons and Comté melted on top. The crouton on top is reminiscent of ancient soups (see history of soup).

Preparation

Recipes for onion soup vary greatly:
Though the liquid is usually meat stock, it may be simply water. Milk may be added. It may be thickened with eggs or flour. It may be gratinéed or not.Marie Ébrard (1927) La bonne cuisine de Madame E. Saint-Ange, Editions Chaix. p. 186.

Generally, recipes specify that the onions should be cooked slowly, becoming caramelized. Brandy, sherry, or white wine is added at the end to deglaze. The soup base is often topped with slices of (toasted) bread (a "croute" or "crouton").

For the gratinéed version, the croute is topped with cheese and broiled or baked.  The soup is then immediately served in the bowl or ramekin in which it was broiled (grilled), baked, or—in family-style—immediately transferred to individual serving bowls via a ladle.

In commerce

Commercial dehydrated onion soup is widely available, and is the key ingredient in French onion dip.

Alternative names
Some alternative names for the soup include:
Soupe à l'oignon à la Parisienne
Gratinée Parisienne
Gratinée des Halles
Gratinée Lyonnaise
Soupe à l'oignon Lyonnaise
Soupe à l'oignon Gratinée

See also

 French cuisine
 French onion dip
 List of French soups and stews
 List of onion dishes
 List of soups
 List of vegetable soups
 Onion sauce
 Sop
 Vegetable soup

References

External links

French soups
Onion-based foods
Ancient dishes
Vegetable soups